The men's 1500 metre freestyle was a swimming event held as part of the swimming at the 1936 Summer Olympics programme. It was the seventh appearance of the event, which was established in 1908. The competition was held from Thursday to Saturday, 13 to 15 August 1936.

Twenty-one swimmers from ten nations competed.

Medalists

Records
These were the standing world and Olympic records (in minutes) prior to the 1936 Summer Olympics.

Results

Heats

Thursday 13 August 1936: The fastest three in each heat and the next two fastest from across the heats advanced to the semi-finals.

Heat 1

Heat 2

Heat 3

Heat 4

Semifinals

Friday 14 August 1936: The fastest three in each semi-final and the fastest fourth-placed from across the heats advanced to the final.

Semifinal 1

Semifinal 2

Final

Saturday 15 August 1936:

References

External links
Olympic Report
 

Swimming at the 1936 Summer Olympics
Men's events at the 1936 Summer Olympics